"I Hate the Music" is a pop song written by George Young and Harry Vanda and recorded by Australian pop singer John Paul Young. The song was released in March 1976 as the lead single from the singer's second studio album, J.P.Y. (1976). It peaked at number 2 on the Kent Music Report in Australia, remaining on the chart for 20 weeks. It was certified gold in Australia. It reached number 1 on the South African singles chart.

In 1998, the song was covered by Ratcat and John Paul Young for the Occasional Coarse Language soundtrack.

Background
The song was inspired by a conversation with George Young and Harry Vanda in the Boomerang House elevator after a day in the studio. The conversation involved George's general frustration with a song that he couldn't get to sound right. The song originally had a banjo introduction but was changed to a piano.

Reception
Cash Box magazine said "The song is about a man who 'hates the music' because it reminds him of an old love. The melody is fresh and attractive. The chorus is a hook."

Track listing 
7" (AP 11037) (Ariola – 17 220)
Side A "I Hate the Music" – 3:25
 Side B "My Name is Jack" – 3:25

Charts

Weekly charts

Year-end charts

Certifications

References 

1976 songs
1976 singles
1998 singles
John Paul Young songs
Songs written by Harry Vanda
Songs written by George Young (rock musician)
Song recordings produced by Harry Vanda
Song recordings produced by George Young (rock musician)
Albert Productions singles
Ariola Records singles